Plague Column in Kutná Hora, also known as Column of the Virgin Mary Immaculate, is located in Šultysova street in Kutná Hora in the Central Bohemian Region of the Czech Republic. It is protected as a cultural heritage.

History
This baroque plague column was built by the Jesuit sculptor František Baugut. It originated between 1713 and 1715 as a commemoration of the contemporary plague which killed more than a thousand people. The column is decorated by the statue of the Virgin Mary Immaculate and Kutná Hora's typical labor themes (reliefs of miners).

See also
Plague Column, Vienna

References

External links

Plague Column on Kutná Hora information portal, (in Czech)

Marian and Holy Trinity columns
Baroque architecture in the Czech Republic
1710s establishments in the Holy Roman Empire